Doctor Who is a long-running British science fiction series.

Doctor Who may also refer to:

Media based on the television series
 Whoniverse, the fictional universe of the British science-fiction programme Doctor Who
 The Doctor (Doctor Who), the main character in the British television series
 Doctor Who (film), the television movie starring Paul McGann, based on the television series
 Dr. Who (Dalek films), the human character played by Peter Cushing in two films based on the television series
 Doctor Who (pinball), pinball machine based on the television series
 "Doctorin' the Tardis" a 1988 novelty mash-up song by The Timelords based on Doctor Who theme music

Other uses
 "Doctor Who" (CSI), the 22nd episode of the 10th season of CSI: Crime Scene Investigation
 Dr. Who, the villain of The King Kong Show (1966–1969) and King Kong Escapes (1967)
 "Dr. Who!" (Tujamo and Plastik Funk song), titled "Dr. Who" and instrumental titled "Who"

See also

 Torchwood (disambiguation)
 
 
 
 
 
 Doctor (disambiguation)
 Who (disambiguation)